Tinka Easton (born 15 June 1996) is an  Australian judoka.

As a 10-year-old, Easton joined the Bushido Judo Club at the Shoalhaven Heads Community Centre in New South Wales. She claimed three consecutive Australian under-21 titles between 2014 and 2016, followed by three consecutive senior titles from 2017 to 2019.

Easton was number 1 of the IJF World Ranking for juniors U52kg in 2014. Easton was the 2017 Oceania Championships winner, and made her world championship debut in 2017 and won bronze.

Easton won gold in the Judo at the 2022 Commonwealth Games – Women's 52 kg against Canada's Kelly Deguchi, winning via a Waza-ari throw, during the golden score period.

References

1996 births
Living people
Australian female judoka
Commonwealth Games gold medallists for Australia
Commonwealth Games medallists in judo
Judoka at the 2022 Commonwealth Games
21st-century Australian women
Medallists at the 2022 Commonwealth Games